Marco Lanna (born 13 July 1968) is an Italian former professional footballer who played at both club and international levels as a defender. He is the current chairman of Sampdoria.

Playing career
Born in Genoa, Lanna began his career with Sampdoria, moving to Roma with a four-year agreement for 800 million lire per year. He left the club at the end of his contract and joined Spanish club Salamanca as free agent, and, after two further years, he moved to Real Zaragoza.

He earned two caps for Italy between 1992 and 1993, including in one FIFA World Cup qualifier.

Later career 
In August 2011 Lanna was appointed director of football of Piacenza. He left the club in January 2012.

On 27 December 2021, he was named new chairman of Sampdoria following the resignation of Massimo Ferrero.

References

1968 births
Living people
Italian footballers
Italy international footballers
Association football defenders
Italy B international footballers
U.C. Sampdoria players
A.S. Roma players
UD Salamanca players
Real Zaragoza players
Serie A players
Serie B players
La Liga players
Italian expatriate footballers
Italian expatriate sportspeople in Spain
Expatriate footballers in Spain
U.C. Sampdoria directors
Piacenza Calcio 1919 non-playing staff